Sir John Allan Birch  (24 May 1935 – 6 May 2020) was a British diplomat who was knighted in 1993. He was educated at Leighton Park School and Corpus Christi College, Cambridge. Sir John was Ambassador to Hungary until his retirement in 1995.

Diplomatic career
John Birch joined the Foreign Office in 1959 and was posted as Third Secretary to Paris in 1960. Subsequently, he went as Second Secretary to Singapore in 1963; to Bucharest in 1965 as First Secretary and to UKMIS Geneva in 1968. He was Head of Chancery in Kabul in 1973 before returning to London in 1977 as Counsellor at the Royal College of Defence Studies. Later that year, John Birch was appointed Political Adviser at UKDEL CTB Geneva and moved in 1980 to Budapest as Counsellor/Head of Chancery. From 1983 to 1986, he served at the FCO as Head of Eastern European Department before being posted to UKMIS New York City as Deputy Permanent Representative (with the personal rank of Ambassador). In 1989, Sir John Birch was appointed Ambassador to Hungary.

Post-retirement
Sir John Birch was Director of the British Association for Central and Eastern Europe from 1995 to 2004. He was Vice–Chairman of the Council of University College London, Chairman of the Advisory Board of the School of Slavonic and East European Studies and a member of the Royal Institute of International Affairs. He was a non–executive Director of the private security firm AEGIS, having previously served on the AEGIS Advisory Council.

He died from cancer on 6 May 2020 at the age of 84.

Family
John Birch married Primula Clare Haselden in 1960. They had three sons (1962, 1963 and 1969) and one daughter (1967).

Further reading
Interview of Sir John Birch by Virginia Crowe, 2004, British Diplomatic Oral History Programme (BDOHP), transcript

References

Alumni of Corpus Christi College, Cambridge
Ambassadors of the United Kingdom to Hungary
1935 births
2020 deaths
Members of HM Diplomatic Service
Knights Commander of the Royal Victorian Order
Companions of the Order of St Michael and St George
People educated at Leighton Park School
20th-century British diplomats